Stadionul Aerostar is a multi-purpose stadium in Bacău, Romania. It is currently used mostly for football matches and is the home ground of Aerostar Bacău. The stadium holds 1,500 people and is located near the airport.

References

Football venues in Romania
Sport in Bacău
Buildings and structures in Bacău County